Arute Field is a 5,500-seat multi-purpose stadium in New Britain, Connecticut, United States. It is home to the Central Connecticut State University Blue Devils Football and Men's and Women's Lacrosse teams.

The first incarnation of Arute Field was on land now occupied by the Elihu Burritt Library. The field was moved to its current location in the late 1960s. Jack Arute Sr., the owner of what was then one of the state's largest construction businesses, built the first field to bear his family's name.

The second incarnation of the stadium was built in 1970 and demolished in 1998. The third and current version of the stadium was built on the same site of the second one, and opened in November 2000. Before the 2012 season, 2,500 seats were added to the east side of the stadium as well as a new state-of-the-art video board.

See also
 List of NCAA Division I FCS football stadiums

References

External links
Central Connecticut State Blue Devils - Arute Field

Buildings and structures in New Britain, Connecticut
College football venues
College lacrosse venues in the United States
Central Connecticut Blue Devils football
American football venues in Connecticut
Lacrosse venues in Connecticut
Multi-purpose stadiums in the United States
Sports venues in Hartford County, Connecticut
Ultimate (sport) venues
2000 establishments in Connecticut
Sports venues completed in 2000